Viola Canales (born 21 April 1957) is a Lecturer in Law at Stanford Law School as well as a writer who has published two novels, a short story collection, and a book of poetry. She is best known for The Tequila Worm (2005), which won several awards, including the Pura Belpré Award and others.

Education 
Originally from McAllen, Texas, Canales received a scholarship to attend St. Stephen's Episcopal School in Austin, Texas, when she was 15 years old. She was matriculated at Harvard College in 1979 but took two leaves of absence during her undergraduate years to first work as a community organizer for United Farm Workers and secondly to serve in the United States Army at Fort Benning. She graduated cum laude in 1986 and went on to earn her Juris Doctor from Harvard Law School in 1989.

Career 
She was also stationed in West Germany and served as a tactical director overseeing the Patriot and Hawk missile systems. She reached the rank of captain.

After graduating from Harvard Law School, Canales worked at O'Melveny & Myers, a white-shoe law firm in Los Angeles, where she worked for the Christopher Commission, which was established in 1991 to investigate the Los Angeles Police Department for assaulting Rodney King. She also served as Civil Service Commissioner in Los Angeles and San Francisco. In 1994, Canales was appointed regional administrator for the Small Business Administration in the Clinton Administration, where she helped guarantee $3 billion in loans annually in California, Nevada, Arizona, Hawaii, and Guam.  She is currently a lecturer at Stanford Law School, where she teaches courses that combine law and fiction writing.

She published a short story collection, Orange Candy Slices and Other Secret Tales (2001), and a novel, The Tequila Worm (2005), for which in 2006 she won the Pura Belpré Award, a PEN Center USA Award, and was named a notable book by the American Library Association. In 2014, she published a bilingual collection of poems, The Little Devil and the Rose: Lotería Poems / El diablito y la rosa: Poemas de la lotería and in October 2020 she published her second novel, Cecilia's Magical Mission.

Personal life 
Her partner is Pamela Karlan, a professor of law at Stanford Law School and Principal Deputy Assistant Attorney General in the Civil Rights Division in the Biden administration.

Bibliography

References 

Living people
American women writers
Harvard Law School alumni
LGBT academics
LGBT Hispanic and Latino American people
LGBT people from Texas
American LGBT writers
People from McAllen, Texas
American writers of Mexican descent
1957 births
Harvard College alumni
United States Army officers
Women in the United States Army
21st-century American women
Military personnel from Texas